Polayathode or Polayathodu is one of the fastest growing neighbourhoods of the city of Kollam, in the state of Kerala, India. It is situated at National Highways – NH 66 (Earlier NH 47). Kerala Police have identified Polayathode as one of the traffic black spots in the state.

Location
 Kollam Junction railway station - 
 Andamukkam City Bus Stand - 
 Kollam KSRTC Bus Station - 
 Kollam Port - 
 Chinnakada - 
 Tangasseri -

Importance
Polayathode is one of the highly urbanized areas of Kollam. The proximity of Polayathode to major places in the city including Pattathanam, Chinnakada, Mundakkal and Thattamala make it an important destination in the city. One of the major public crematoriums in Kollam is situated at Polayathode.

Major public/private institutions in Polayathode
 ESI Dispensary
 Public Crematorium
 KFC
 Domino's Pizza
 Reebok
 Max Fashion
 West Side 
 Fabindia
 WoodLand
 Eye Mall
 Public Market
 V V Electricals, Plumbing and Sanitary
 Enfit Drug Bank
 PORUNNELSTORES

See also
 Kollam
 Kollam Beach
 Chinnakada
 Andamukkam City Bus Stand
 Kadappakada
 Asramam Maidan

References

Neighbourhoods in Kollam